"Plundered My Soul" is a song by the English rock band the Rolling Stones, featured as a bonus track on the 2010 re-release of their 1972 album Exile on Main St.. It was the first song released by the band from the new recordings, limited-edition copies of the single shelved in independent stores on 17 April 2010, in honor of Record Store Day. The song charted at number 2 on Billboard's Singles Sales and number 42 on Billboards Rock Songs Airplay. It also reached number 15 in France, and remained there for one week. The music video was directed by Jonas Odell.

"Plundered My Soul" features vocal and guitar overdubs from Mick Jagger and Mick Taylor, recorded at a London studio in November 2009 as arranged for by Sherry Daly and Saul Davis.

Personnel
The Rolling Stones
 Mick Jagger – lead vocals, acoustic guitar, percussion 
 Keith Richards - rhythm guitar 
 Mick Taylor – lead guitar
 Bill Wyman – bass guitar
 Charlie Watts – drums

Additional musicians
 Nicky Hopkins – piano, organ
 Bobby Keys – saxophone
 Lisa Fisher – backing vocals
 Cindy Mizelle – backing vocals

Charts

Notes

2010 singles
Songs written by Jagger–Richards
The Rolling Stones songs
Song recordings produced by Don Was
Universal Music Group singles
Record Store Day releases
Song recordings produced by Jimmy Miller
Song recordings produced by Jagger–Richards
1971 songs